Qorban Kandi may refer to:
 Qorban Kandi, Hashtrud, East Azerbaijan Province
 Qorban Kandi, Malekan, East Azerbaijan Province
 Qorban Kandi, West Azerbaijan